Wiang Kaen is the easternmost district (amphoe) of Chiang Rai province, northern Thailand.

History
Historically, the area was Mueang Wiang Kaen, on the Ngao River. It was founded about the same time of Sukhothai Kingdom and Chiang Rai.

The government separated the three tambons Muang Yai, Po, and Lai Ngao from Chiang Khong district to create a minor district (king amphoe) on 1 April 1987. It was upgraded to a full district on 7 September 1995.

Geography
Neighboring districts are (from the south clockwise) Thoeng, Khun Tan, Chiang Khong of Chiang Rai Province. To the east lies Bokeo province of Laos.

Phu Chi Fa, 1,442 m high, lies at the border with Thoeng District.

Administration
The district is divided into four sub-districts (tambons), which are further subdivided into 41 villages (mubans). There are no municipal (thesabans), and four tambon administrative organizations (TAO).

References

External links

amphoe.com

Wiang Kaen